Winthrop Square, also known as Training Field, is a historic park and former training field in Boston's Charlestown neighborhood, in the U.S. state of Massachusetts. The Charlestown Civil War Memorial is installed in the park.

References

External links
 

Charlestown, Boston
Parks in Boston